Myrmedoniina is a large subtribe of rove beetles in the tribe Lomechusini, containing the following genera: 

Abothrus
Acanthastilbus
Aenictocleptis
Aenictonia
Aenictozyras
Allardiana
Allodinarda
Amaurodera
Amazoncharis
Amblyoponiphilus
Anepipleuronia
Ankaratraella
Anommatochara
Anopsapterus
Anthropeltodonia
Apteranillus
Apteraphaenops
Astilbides
Aulacocephalonia
Borneozyras
Bothriocrata
Brachypteronia
Brachysipalia
Camerouniella
Cantaloubeia
Catarractodes
Chaetosogonocephus
Conradsia
Creodonia
Dabra
Dabrosoma
Degalliera
Dentazyras
Deroleptus
Dinocoryna
Dinusella
Diplopleurus
Doratoporus
Dromacamatus
Dromanomma
Dromeciton
Drugia
Drusilla
Drusillota
Dysamblys
Ecitana
Ecitocala
Ecitocerus
Ecitocryptodes
Ecitocryptus
Ecitodiscus
Ecitodonia
Ecitoglossa
Ecitonia
Ecitonidia
Ecitonilla
Ecitopelta
Ecitophila
Ecitophiletus
Ecitophrura
Ecitoplectus
Ecitopolites
Ecitopora
Ecitotyphlus
Ecitoxenidia
Euryalusa
Eurydiotyphla
Falagonia
Falagonilla
Gallardoia
Gapia
Gramminopleurus
Gryptaulacus
Haplomyrmemonia
Heteroporus
Homalodonia
Kakodaimonia
Katanganella
Kenyanella
Kolwezia
Labidilla
Labidoculex
Lamprostenusa
Leiorhopala
Leleupidiella
Leptogenoxenus
Macrogerodonia
Madecazyras
Malaiseium
Manikaella
Maschwitzia
Meronera
Methneria
Methnerotherium
Microdonia
Mimoplandria
Monobothrus
Myrmechusa
Myrmechusina
Myrmecopella
Myrmecoxenia
Myrmedonota
Myrmigaster
Myrmoecia
Neocamacopalpus
Neolara
Neosmectonia
Neowroughtonilla
Ocyplanus
Orphnebius
Oxylidia
Pachorhopala
Papuanusa
Paramyrmoecia
Paraporus
Parastilbus
Pedinopleurus
Periergopus
Pheidologitonetes
Philastilbus
Philusina
Platyastilbus
Platyusa
Plesiadda
Porus
Propinquitas
Pseudastilbus
Pseudodinusa
Pseudodrusilla
Pseudopachorhopala
Pseudoporus
Pseudothamiaraea
Quarternio
Rhopalybia
Rhoptrodinarda
Salutoporus
Scotodonia
Smectonia
Stenocyplanus
Stenopleurus
Stichodonia
Strabocephalium
Synthoracastilbus
Termitognathus
Terrecorvonia
Tetrabothrus
Tetradonella
Tetradonia
Tetragnypeta
Tetralophodes
Thlibopleurus
Thoracastilbus
Thoracophagus
Togpelenys
Trachydonia
Trachyota
Trichodonia
Tropiochara
Typhlonusa
Typhlozyras
Urodonia
Vertexprorogatio
Wasmannina
Wroughtonilla
Xesturida
Zyras

References

Aleocharinae
Insect subtribes